Havering and Redbridge is a territorial constituency represented on the London Assembly by one Assembly Member (AM). The constituency was created in 2000 at the same time as the London Assembly and has elections every four years. It consists of the combined area of the London Borough of Havering and the London Borough of Redbridge. The current assembly member is Keith Prince of the Conservative Party who was first elected in 2016.

Constituency profile
Created in 2000, Havering and Redbridge has elected only Conservative AMs to date. The current AM is Keith Prince, first elected in 2016.

The Conservative win upon its creation in 2000 was somewhat unexpected, as at that point, the vast majority of the area it covers (excluding two Redbridge wards that fall under the Chingford and Woodford Green parliamentary seat) was represented by Labour MPs. However, the Romford and Upminster constituencies were among the very small number of seats that the Conservatives gained from Labour at the subsequent general election of 2001.

In line with this, the Conservative majority increased here in 2004, while the trend towards the Conservatives in this area of London continued in the 2005 general election result, which saw the Conservatives winning increased majorities in the two seats they already held, whilst also gaining the constituencies of Hornchurch and Ilford North from Labour. Consequently, this London Assembly seat became very safe for the Conservatives in the 2008 election, where they got more than twice as many votes as Labour.

The seat has, however, become extremely marginal in recent years, following a swing of almost 12% to Labour in the 2012 election. This swing against the Conservatives preluded Labour gaining a majority on Redbridge Council in 2014 for the first time since its creation, the Conservatives losing overall control on Havering Council and Labour gaining the Ilford North seat back from the Conservatives at the 2015 general election. The seat became slightly more marginal in 2016, but it was not enough for Labour to gain it.

Assembly members

Mayoral election results 
Below are the results for the candidate which received the highest share of the popular vote in the constituency at each mayoral election.

Assembly election results

References

London Assembly constituencies
Politics of the London Borough of Havering
Politics of the London Borough of Redbridge
Constituencies established in 2000